Bill Green (born 26 January 1932) is  a former Australian rules footballer who played with Richmond in the Victorian Football League (VFL).

Notes

External links 
		

1932 births
Living people
Australian rules footballers from Victoria (Australia)
Richmond Football Club players